Disconatis is a genus of marine annelids in the family Polynoidae (scale worms). The genus includes two species which are both commensal with other kinds of marine Annelida and occur in Australia and New Zealand.

Species
As at September 2020, there are two species within Disconatis:
Disconatis accolus
Disconatis contubernalis

Description
Disconatis is a long-bodied genus with up to 152 segments and 22–80 pairs of elytra which are small and translucent; the first pair are much larger than the following elytra. The lateral antennae are inserted ventral to the median antenna. The notopodium is vestigial and notochaetae are absent. The neuropodium is rounded and the neurochaetae are uinidentate but have serrations on the convex side.

Biology and ecology
Both known species of Disconatis are commensal, with each species living in the tubes of marine annelids in a different family: Arenicolidae and Maldanidae.

References

Phyllodocida
Polychaete genera